Judge Burgess may refer to:

Christopher J. Burke (fl. 1990s–2020s), magistrate judge of the United States District Court for the District of Delaware
Harold P. Burke (1895–1981), judge of the United States District Court for the Western District of New York
Liles C. Burke (born 1969), judge of the United States District Court for the Northern District of Alabama
Lloyd Hudson Burke (1916–1988), judge of the United States District Court for the Northern District of California

See also
Justice Burke (disambiguation)